Capdepera is a small municipality on Majorca, one of the Balearic Islands, Spain.

Capdepera is a historical village just 8 km from Artà. Originally there had been a watchtower where the Castle of Capdepera stands today which was used to guard the coast. In 1300 James II of Aragon ordered the construction of a fortified village which would control the uninhabited land below and the maritime routes with Majorca.

For centuries the village survived behind its walls protected from pirate attacks. As the danger of such attacks disappeared residents of the walled town started to relocate themselves at the bottom of the 162m hill which led to the development of modern-day Capdepera. The better known town of nearby Cala Ratjada actually developed as the fishing and trading port of Capdepera and to this day operates a ferry service with neighbouring Menorca.

 many German expatriates reside in Capdepera. From 2016 to 2017 the foreign population in the commune declined by 240.

References

Related articles 
 Puig des Racó

Municipalities in Mallorca